is a Japanese anime television series produced by Shaft, based on the American web series RWBY created by Monty Oum for Rooster Teeth. The series aired from July to September 2022. A manga adaptation illustrated by Kumiko Suekane began serialization in ASCII Media Works's shōnen manga magazine Dengeki Daioh in June 2022.

Voice cast

Production and release
In February 2022, a website for a RWBY project, dubbed the "Team RWBY Project", was opened with future announcements listed to come. The following month, an anime series was announced on March 25, 2022. It is produced by Shaft and directed by Toshimasa Suzuki, with chief direction by Kenjirou Okada, visual director by Nobuyuki Takeuchi, animation concept by Gen Urobuchi, scripts written by Tow Ubukata, and music composed by Nobuko Toda and Kazuma Jinnouchi. Nobuhiro Sugiyama (Shaft) designed the characters for animation, based on character concepts by illustrator Huke. Sugiyama was the chief animation director alongside Hiroki Yamamura (Shaft), Yoshiaki Itou (Shaft), and Rina Iwamoto. Kana Miyai, Hiroto Nagata, and Kazuki Kawada (the latter both of Shaft) are the main animators. The series aired from July 3 to September 18, 2022, on Tokyo MX, BS11, and MBS. The first three episodes were streamed on YouTube from June 24 to 26. The opening theme song is "Beyond Selves" by Void_Chords feat. L, while the ending theme song is "Awake" by Saori Hayami. Crunchyroll will stream the series along with an English dub. Billy Kametz was originally cast as Roman Torchwick in the English dub of the anime, but was later recast by Christopher Wehkamp after his 2022 hiatus and death. On March 24, voice actress Arryn Zech expressed discomfort with being involved in Ice Queendom upon being made aware of the 2015 domestic abuse allegations concerning series writer Tow Ubukata. This prompted Ubukata to tweet in response to Zech. Zech later tweeted again to confirm that she would be reprising her voice role of Blake Belladonna in the English dub of Ice Queendom, stating that she had internal discussions with the staff and that she would be donating her payment for her work to an undisclosed charity.

Pre-production on the series started a few years prior to the announcement of the project, with series writer Miles Luna, as well as other members of the RWBY production team, visited Good Smile Company and animation studios Shaft and Trigger as early as 2018. Original character designer Huke and animation concept writer Gen Urobuchi were initially contacted to conceptualize the project prior to the director and main writer. After Huke had created the concept designs for the series and Urobuchi had conceptualized the main narrative for the series, director Toshimasa Suzuki was brought on board for the project; Suzuki's initial thoughts on Urobuchi's story was that it was "wonderful"; however, as Urobuchi wasn't on the project as the series' writer, Suzuki and members of the production team needed to find a separate writer to finalize Urobuchi's drafts. Tow Ubukata was among the writers whom the team considered contacting, and since Suzuki had worked with Ubukata on Fafner in the Azure and Heroic Age, he was chosen as the series composition and screenplay writer. Urobuchi, Suzuki, and Ubukata were all present during script meetings for the series, and Ubukata (whose main role was to organize Urobuchi's concepts into a singular, coherent narrative) stated that he would add bits of his own creative ideas whenever he could while the latter half of the project had ideas escalated from its initial plans. Suzuki stated that he focused on visual directing, while he left the narrative elements to Ubukata.

Suzuki and Ubukata have commented that the cultural differences between Japanese and American productions was interesting due to different focuses from each respective culture in their narrative writing. For example, the themes of discrimination and racial prejudice were brought up between the two of them in reference to characters Weiss Schnee and Blake Belladona, the former of which holds racial prejudices and the latter of which is the victim of discrimination. As Japanese productions usually do not have a main character who is outright discriminated against, racial issues are usually not a big thematic subject. Ubukata referred to writing the series and consciously keeping the themes of racism and discrimination as a new experience for him.

In July 2022, the series was described as "continuity-adjacent" with opening episodes pulling from the first two seasons of RWBY and then launching into a new story set between the second and third seasons of RWBY but diverting "off the core timeline". The series received a 12 episode order and will be released in Blu-Ray and DVD forms. The Blu-Ray and DVD release was originally scheduled for release in January 2023, but was delayed to July 2023 to give the staff time to polish the animation and include new sequences, such as an animated opening that was absent from the television airing.

Episodes
Ice Queendom's plot is set between the continuity of RWBY Volume 1 and Volume 2, as the first three episodes are in essence a recap of Volume 1 with additional story events that lead into Ice Queendom's original story, and the final episode is set during Volume 2's first episode.

Only one episode was handled outside of Shaft, that being episode 6, which was produced at Yokohama Animation Lab.

Other media

Manga
A manga adaptation illustrated by Kumiko Suekane began serialization in ASCII Media Works's Dengeki Daioh magazine on June 27, 2022. The first tankōbon volume was released on September 9, 2022.

Reception
Writing for Anime News Network, Richard Eisenbeis, Nicholas Dupree, James Beckett, and Caitlin Moore gave mixed reviews to the series' premiere of the first three episodes; Eisenbeis stated that he was "entertained", but that the show lacks the energy of RWBY, while Dupree praised the fight scenes but called the series nothing special and "a mess"; Beckett called the production values "inconsistent"; and Moore called the premiere "not very good." Matthew Magnus Lundeen of Gamerant called the series "special" while re-doing scenes from early Volume 1 episodes of RWBY, praised the art design as an improvement over its source material, and said the series has the potential to be "the best in the franchise" while criticizing the end of episode 3 as "too rushed". Writing for Anime Feminist, Meru Clewis praised the visuals, soundtrack, and expressed interest in the deviations from the original story, but criticized the series' perceived assumption of viewer familiarity with the franchise, characterizing the first three episodes as "infodumps that assume you’re coming from the source material." Clewis also praised the inclusion of new character Shion Zaiden as a positive addition of non-binary gender representation.

Notes

References

External links
  
 

ASCII Media Works manga
Crunchyroll anime
Dengeki Daioh
RWBY
Shaft (company)
Shōnen manga
Tokyo MX original programming